Adolf "Adi" Fischera (22 August 1888 – 25 August 1938) was an Austrian international footballer. At club level, he played for ASK Schwechat, Wiener AC, Wiener AF, SC Germania Schwechat, Borussia Neunkirchen and First Vienna FC. He made 15 appearances for the Austria national team, scoring eight goals.

On 26 May 1912 WAF hosted a match with Middlesex Wanderers whom they beat 5-1. Cookson scored for Middlesex and Fischera scored a hattrick for WAF, with two more goals from Engelbert König (senior) and Richard 'Little' Kohn. He also managed Borussia Neunkirchen.

He was also part of Austria's squad for the football tournament at the 1912 Summer Olympics, but he did not play in any matches.

References

External links
 
 

1888 births
1938 deaths
Association football forwards
Austrian footballers
Austria international footballers